Jacob "Jake" Brewer (January 20, 1981 – September 19, 2015) was an American White House aide, immigration activist, and liberal commentator. He was a White House senior policy adviser to the Office of Science and Technology Policy in President Barack Obama's administration. Brewer was known for his work as a co-founder of the immigration activism group Define American. He had earlier worked at Change.org.

Brewer died in a collision with a car in Mount Airy, Maryland, while participating in a charity bicycle ride for cancer treatment programs. He was married to Mary Katharine Ham, with whom he had two children.

References

American bloggers
Vanderbilt University alumni
Brewer
Immigrant rights activists
Road incident deaths in Maryland
1981 births
2015 deaths